Kishanganj district is one of the thirty-eight districts of Bihar state, India, and Kishanganj town is the administrative headquarters of this district. Kishanganj district is a part of Purnia division (Seemanchal).

History
Kishanganj district, which was previously part of Purnia district, is part of the Mithila region.
Mithila first gained prominence after being settled by Indo-Aryan peoples who established the Mithila Kingdom (also called Kingdom of the Videhas) which was ruled by the Videhas, an Indo-Aryan tribe.

During the late Vedic period (c. 1100–500 BCE), Kingdom of the Videhas became one of the major political and cultural centers of South Asia, along with Kuru and Pañcāla. The kings of the Kingdom of the Videhas were called Janakas.
The Mithila Kingdom was later incorporated into the Vajjika League, which had its capital in the city of Vaishali, which is also in Mithila.

Kishanganj was an old and important Sub-Division of Purnia district. After the long and hard struggle of around seventeen years by the people of Kishanganj including social workers, politicians, journalists, businessmen, farmers, etc., the Kishanganj district was carved out of Purnia district on 14 January 1990.

Geography
A narrow strip of West Bengal, about 20 km wide separates it from Bangladesh.

Kishanganj district is located between 250 20’ and 260 30’ north latitudes, and 870 7’ and 880 19’ east longitudes.

River 
Major rivers flowing through the district are Mahananda, Kankai, Mechi, Donk, Ratua  .

Politics 
  

|}

Economy
In 2006 the Ministry of Panchayati Raj named Kishanganj one of the country's 250 most backward districts out of a total of 640. It is one of the 36 districts in Bihar currently receiving funds from the Backward Regions Grant Fund Programme (BRGF).

Kishanganj is the only tea producing district in Bihar.

Sub-divisions
The district comprises only one sub-division, Kishanganj, which is further divided into seven blocks :  

 Bhahadurganj
 Dighalbank 
 Kishanganj
 Kochadhaman 
 Pothia
 Terhagachha
 Thakurganj

Education
On 30 January 2014, the foundation stone was laid down of the Kishanganj campus of Aligarh Muslim University by Sonia Gandhi. The study centre started out by offering two courses.

Demographics

According to the 2011 census Kishanganj district has a population of 1,690,400, roughly equal to the nation of Guinea-Bissau or the US state of Idaho. This gives it a ranking of 293rd in India (out of a total of 640). Its population growth rate over the decade 2001-2011 was 30.44%. Kishanganj has a sex ratio of 946 females for every 1,000 males, and a literacy rate of 57.04%. 9.53% of the population lives in urban areas. Scheduled Castes and Scheduled Tribes make up 6.69% and 3.80% of the population respectively.

A vast majority of the people live in villages. Kishanganj is the only Muslim-majority district of Bihar, with Muslims forming about 68 per cent of the population. There are also Hindus of whom most are Surajpuris (Rajbanshi). There also are small pockets of Santals. Most of the inhabitants of Kishanganj speak Surajpuri.

At the time of the 2011 Census of India, 42.61% of the population in the district spoke Surjapuri, 32.62% Urdu, 9.05 Hindi, 6.66% Bengali, 3.45% Santali, 2.63% Maithili and 1.23% Bhojpuri as their first language.

Administrative units 

 Number of Revenue Division(s)- 1
 Number of Blocks- 7
 Number of Police Stations- 20
 Number of Gram Panchayats- 126
 Number of Census Villages- 771
 Number of Municipalities- 3
 Number of Municipal Corporation- 1

See also - Literacy In Bihar

Notable people 
Asrarul Haq Qasmi

References

External links
 Official website
 Kishanganj Information Portal

 
Purnia division
Districts of Bihar
Minority Concentrated Districts in India
1990 establishments in Bihar